Cedric Akeem Humes (born August 7, 1983 in Virginia Beach, Virginia) is an American football running back who was drafted by the Pittsburgh Steelers in the last round of the 2006 NFL Draft.

Early life

Humes is a notable alumnus of Princess Anne High School. Around 2001, Humes committed to Virginia Tech University.

College

Humes attended Virginia Tech. Humes missed the 2004 preseason scrimmages with an injury. Humes was instrumental in their 2005 ACC Coastal Division Title. He was named the MVP of the 2006 Toyota Gator Bowl after helping the Virginia Tech Hokies defeat the Louisville Cardinals 35-24.

NFL career

The Steelers placed Humes on the practice squad/injured reserve list, ending his season.

On December 21, 2006 Humes was signed to the New York Giants practice squad, whence he was sent to NFL Europe. During the off season there, Humes broke his neck during the last game of the season and was subsequently released in July, 2007.

Post-football career
After his stint in the NFL, Humes moved back to Virginia Beach, VA. He worked at Salem High School where he taught Algebra and worked with special needs students, and then as a high school math teacher at Madison Alternative in Norfolk, Virginia. He now works for Coca-Cola out of Norfolk.

References

1983 births
Living people
Sportspeople from Virginia Beach, Virginia
American football running backs
Virginia Tech Hokies football players
Pittsburgh Steelers players
New York Giants players
Amsterdam Admirals players
Princess Anne High School alumni